Dhṛṭaka or Dhītika (提多迦) was a Buddhist monk from Magadha.  He is recognized as the fifth Indian patriarch in Chan Buddhism as recorded in the Record of the Dharma-Jewel throughout Successive Generations (歴代法寶記). His teacher was Upagupta.

Life
Dhṛṭaka was the son of a wealthy brahmin. After ordaining as a Buddhist monk, he traveled to Mathura where he trained under Upagupta. Under his teacher's guidance, Dhṛṭaka received the sevenfold instructions and achieved arhatship.

According to tradition, Dhṛṭaka proselytized extensively, successfully introducing Buddhism to the Tokharians in central Asia. In the lineage of Chan Buddhism, he traveled to Madhyadeśa, where he converted Micchaka and his 8,000 disciples to Buddhism.

References

Chan patriarchs
Seon patriarchs
Indian Buddhist monks
Early Buddhism
Soto Zen
Indian royal advisors
Brahmins
Indian Buddhist missionaries